MVSL may refer to:
Martha's Vineyard Sign Language
Maghreb Virtual Science Library